The Anti-fascist Assembly for the National Liberation of Serbia ( / Antifašistička skupština narodnog oslobođenja Srbije; acr. АСНОС / ASNOS) was formed in November 1944, as the governing body of the Yugoslav National-Liberation Movement in the newly liberated Serbia. President of ASNOS was Siniša Stanković.

In the autumn of 1944, Serbia was liberated by partisan forces and the Red Army. As soon as Belgrade was liberated on 20 October, creation of new administration was initiated. In early November 1944, the Great Anti-Fascist People's Liberation Assembly of Serbia in Belgrade. It consisted of more than eight hundred delegates, elected throughout liberated regions of Serbia. In order to form permanent representative body, delegates elected 250 representatives, thus constituting the Anti-fascist Assembly for the National Liberation of Serbia. In the same time, they affirmed the policy of reconstituting Yugoslavia as a federation, with Serbia as one of its federal units. Thus was initiated the process that led to the creation of the Federated State of Serbia, as a federated state within new Democratic Federal Yugoslavia.

Presidium

See also
 History of Serbia
 History of the Serbs
 History of Yugoslavia

References

Sources

 
 
 
 
 
 
 

Serbia in World War II
Anti-Fascist Council for the National Liberation of Yugoslavia
Anti-fascism in Serbia
Communism in Serbia
Political history of Serbia
Yugoslav Serbia
1944 establishments in Serbia